The opening ceremony of the fifth season of Indian Premier League (IPL) took place on the evening of 3 April 2012 in the YMCA College of Physical Education, Chennai. The ceremony was designed by Wizcraft Entertainment, and began at 19:30 IST, lasting almost two and half hours. Similar to the previous versions, the captains of the nine participating teams took the "MCC Spirit of Cricket" pledge. Various Bollywood actors, dancers, and musicians performed in the ceremony.

Background
The event was planned to be held at M. A. Chidambaram Stadium, but was shifted to the YMCA College of Physical Education ground. The capacity of the YMCA college was lesser than that of the M. A. Chidambaram Stadium, and this caused disappointment. Tamil Nadu Cricket Association said that the decision was made because the opening match was to be played at the M. A. Chidambaram Stadium, and thus they cannot have opening ceremony in it due to risk of the cricket ground getting damaged by the performances. Sabbas Joseph, director of Wizcraft Entertainment, talking about the ceremony stated that, "There will be good things, lots of entertainment and cricket. It's the first time that such a large-scale, separate concert is being organised for the IPL, so big things have been planned."

Ceremony

The ceremony started at 19:30 IST, however the gates were opened at 17:00 IST. A huge cut out poster of Salman Khan was kept at the YMCA ground prior to the ceremony. The ceremony was hosted by Amitabh Bachchan who had undergone two abdominal surgeries in February 2012. Earlier he had conveyed a message via Twitter saying, "April 3rd is the day for the opening. Preparing for it already. Getting back into the grind." Media reports suggested that Bachchan will be dancing, however Joseph said that this is unlikely to happen. He began the ceremony by reciting a poem, "If I were to be born again" by Prasoon Joshi. Later, the Colonial Cousins, along with South African band First Project and DJ Ravi Drums, performed in the ceremony. It was followed by Priyanka Chopra performing with cricketers like Harbhajan Singh on various songs from her films. Prabhu Deva also performed on songs from his films such as Wanted and Hum Se Hai Muqablah.

After that, few members of the Chennai Super Kings' squad arrived on the stage, and Chopra joined them. Later Kareena Kapoor danced to songs from her films Ra.One and Agent Vinod. The performances of Chopra and Kapoor were choreographed by Shiamak Davar and his companions. After the dance performances, the captains of the nine teams took the "MCC Spirit of Cricket" pledge. Captain of the defending champions, M.S. Dhoni placed the trophy on the podium and it was followed by the chairman of IPL, Rajiv Shukla crediting the players, franchise owners, supporting staff and the spectators for the success of IPL. He then formally opened the 2012 IPL, saying, "It gives me a great pleasure to flag off the fifth edition of the DLF Indian Premier League, an arena where quality international and domestic cricketers take part in intense contest of strategy and skill. IPL is a platform where talent meets opportunity."

Salman Khan performed on songs from his films Ready, Bodyguard, Wanted, Partner and Jab Pyaar Kiya To Darna Kiya. American pop star Katy Perry closed the ceremony performing "Firework" and "California Gurls". The ceremony ended with fireworks.

References

External links

Official Website of Indian Premier League

Opening ceremony
Opening ceremonies
2012 in Indian cricket
Ceremonies in India